The 2017 OFC Youth Futsal tournament was the first edition of the OFC Youth Futsal Tournament (also known as the OFC U-18 Futsal Tournament), the youth international futsal championship organised by the Oceania Football Confederation (OFC) for the men's and women's national under-18 teams of Oceania. The tournament was held at the Bruce Pulman Arena in Auckland, New Zealand between 4–7 October 2017.

The winners of both the men's and the women's competition – with the exception of New Caledonia who are not an Olympic nation – would directly qualify for the futsal tournament at the 2018 Summer Youth Olympics in Buenos Aires, Argentina. However the qualifying teams cannot be from the same Member Association, so where a country has entered both the men’s and women’s events, the Member Association must nominate their preferred qualification team. It was the first time in Oceania footballs' history that a men's and a women's tournament has been combined.

Teams

Men's
A total of seven (out of 11) OFC members entered the tournament.

Notes
Teams in bold qualified for the Olympics.

Women's
A total of five (out of 11) OFC members entered the tournament, but two teams withdrew prior to the draw. The Auckland Football Federation were also invited to compete.

 (withdrew)

 (withdrew)

Notes
Teams in bold qualified for the Olympics.

Squads

Venue
The matches were played at the Bruce Pulman Arena in Auckland.

Men's tournament

The tournament was played in single round-robin format. The draw for the fixtures was held on 6 September 2017 at the OFC Headquarters in Auckland, New Zealand.

All times are local, NZDT (UTC+13).

Women's tournament

The tournament was played in double round-robin format. The draw for the fixtures was held on 25 August 2017 at the OFC Headquarters in Auckland, New Zealand.

All times are local, NZDT (UTC+13).

Qualified teams for Youth Olympics
The following team from OFC qualified for the 2018 Summer Youth Olympics boys' futsal tournament.

The following team from OFC qualified for the 2018 Summer Youth Olympics girls' futsal tournament.

Notes
Since teams from the same association cannot play in both the Youth Olympics boys' and girls' tournaments, if teams from the same association qualify for both tournaments, they must nominate their preferred qualification team, and the runners-up will qualify instead if the winners are not nominated.
As participation in team sports (Futsal, Beach handball, Field hockey, and Rugby sevens) are limited to one team per gender for each National Olympic Committee (NOC), the participating teams of the 2018 Youth Olympics futsal tournament will be confirmed by mid-2018 after each qualified NOC confirms their participation and any unused qualification places are reallocated.

Awards

References

External links
2017 OFC Youth Futsal Tournament, oceaniafootball.com
Results

Ofc
2017 in futsal
2017 in youth association football
Youth Futsal Tournament
2017 Ofc Youth Futsal Tournament
2017 in New Zealand sport
October 2017 sports events in New Zealand